Alberta Ballet (also known as the Alberta Ballet Company) was founded by Muriel Taylor and Dr. Ruth Carse in 1958 and became a professional company in 1966. The company is a resident company of both the Northern Alberta Jubilee Auditorium in Edmonton, Alberta and the Southern Alberta Jubilee Auditorium in Calgary, Alberta and performs its full season in both venues.

Development 
Carse directed the company until 1975.  She was followed by Jeremy Leslie-Spinks (1975-1976), Brydon Paige (1976–1988), and Ali Pourfarrokh (1988–1998). During Pourfarrokh's tenure, in 1990, the company merged with the Calgary City Ballet and moved into the Nat Christie Centre in Calgary. Since then, it has performed in both Edmonton and Calgary.

Former San Francisco Ballet dancer Mikko Nissinen then directed the company until 2002.  Nissinen introduced Balanchine works, while continuing to commission new works from Canadian and international choreographers.  He toured the company to China, Finland, and Egypt.

Jean Grand-Maître was then appointed as artistic director.

Choreography 

Artistic Director Jean Grand-Maître has choreographed Carmen, which toured China, and Fiddle and the Drum, a collaboration with Joni Mitchell while at the Alberta Ballet. In the spring of 2010 the company built on its ballet and pop collaboration by staging an Elton John production named Elton: Love Lies Bleeding. Elton John reportedly was so moved by Fiddle and the Drum that he asked Alberta Ballet to produce a ballet for him.

Alberta Ballet was the first Canadian company to stage a ballet by Christopher Wheeldon of the New York City Ballet.  Wheeldon choreographed A Midsummer Night's Dream with the company. It also commissioned two pieces from Jorma Elo, of the Boston Ballet.

Canadian choreographer Sabrina Matthews has created pieces the company as well.

2015-2016 season
The season included performances of the glam-rock ballet Love Lies Bleeding, featuring principal dancer Yukichi Hattori in the role of Elton John.

2016-2017 season 

The 2016–2017 season featuring Alberta Ballet company dancers included Dracula, The Nutcracker, Alice in Wonderland, and the World Premiere of Our Canada, a new creation in collaboration with Gordon Lightfoot. Dracula was on-loan from Texas Ballet Theater and choreographed by their artistic director, Ben Stevenson (dancer).

Guest company performances included Shadowland (performed by Pilobolus), a mixed bill from dance company Les Ballets Trockadero de Monte Carlo, and Life (performed by BalletBoyz).

Dancers 
Company artists of Alberta Ballet (2021/22):

Alberta Ballet School 

The Professional Division at Alberta Ballet School is a full-time dance and academic training program for students in grades 7 through 12, with a part-time, dance-only option for those in grades 5 and 6. The School's Dedicated Contemporary Dance Stream is available to students in grades 10, 11 and 12 who wish to focus on contemporary dance.

The School is led by Artistic Principal Ashley McNeil and, in 2018, was recognized by Canadian Heritage for its national impact in training artists for professional artistic careers, at the highest levels.

Other Notable Artistic Staff 

David Adams
Jeremy Leslie-Spinks
Cherice Barton
 Lambros Lambrou
Marianne Beausejour
Scott Harris
Brian Bender
Jay Brooker
Claude Caron
Nicole Caron 
David Chipman Seibert
Svea Eklof
Marc LeClerc
Mark Mahler
Daniel McLaren
Barbara Moore
Kevin Peterman
Michel Rahn
Martin Vallée
Yumiko Takeshima
Greg Zane
Jung Min Hong
Howard Epstein
Clark Blakley
Wayne Mcknight
Anita Bostok
Youri Alechine
Stephanie Achuff

References

External links

 
Companies based in Alberta
Culture of Alberta
1966 establishments in Alberta
Performing groups established in 1966